CV-22, CV22 or CV 22 may refer to:
 Bell-Boeing V-22 Osprey, a tiltrotor aircraft; its CV-22 version is operated by the United States Air Force
 USS Independence (CV-22), an aircraft carrier operated by the U.S. Navy from 1942 to 1946, after which it was sunk in 1951 following nuclear testing at Bikini Atoll
 CV22 Coventry postcode area for Rugby, Warwickshire, England

See also
 CVL-22 (disambiguation)
 C22 (disambiguation)
 V22 (disambiguation)